Paras Nath Kushwaha College or PNK College is a college located at Achhua, Bihar. Established in 1978 it is affiliated under Magadh University. The college offers courses in Art, Science and Commerce at graduate level.

Campus 
The College is situated at Acchua town near Paliganj city in Patna district.

References 

Colleges affiliated to Patliputra University
1978 establishments in Bihar
Educational institutions established in 1978
Patna district